Big Moose is a hamlet located in the Town of Webb in Herkimer County, New York, United States. Big Moose Lake is located east-northeast of the hamlet of Big Moose.

References

Hamlets in Herkimer County, New York
Hamlets in New York (state)